Roger W. Schvaneveldt (born April 11, 1941 in Logan, Utah) is an American experimental psychologist with a focus on basic and applied research in cognitive psychology. He earned a PhD from the University of Wisconsin–Madison in 1967 and has been on the faculties of Stony Brook University (1967–77), New Mexico State University (1977–2000), and Arizona State University (2000–10).

In 1971, Schvaneveldt co-wrote with David E. Meyer the seminal article on semantic priming. He developed Pathfinder Network Scaling with Francis T. (Frank) Durso and others, editing a widely cited book on it in 1990, and has also published on expertise, implicit learning, aviation  psychology, and on discovery in biomedical informatics with Trevor Cohen and others.

Schvaneveldt is a fellow of the American Association for the Advancement of Science, the American Psychological Association, the Psychonomic Society, and the Association for Psychological Science.

Selected publications

See also 

 Implicit stereotype, see paper with Meyer from 1971 ("Facilitation")
 Lexical decision task, see papers from 1971 and 1973
 Word superiority effect, see paper from 1982
 Random indexing, see paper with Cohen from 2009 and 2010
 Indirect tests of memory

References

Further reading 
 , Roger Schvaneveldt

Living people
1941 births
Experimental psychologists
Writers from Logan, Utah
University of Wisconsin–Madison alumni
Stony Brook University faculty
Arizona State University faculty
New Mexico State University faculty